Hobicha is  woredas in Wolaita Zone of Southern Nations, Nationalities, and Peoples' Region, Ethiopia. The woreda is established in 2019 from the surrounding woredas. And those surrounding woredas formed border to the Hobicha woreda.  Hobicha is bordered on the south by Bilate River and Lake Abaya, on the west by the Abala Abaya woreda, on the north by the Damot Weyde woreda, on the east  by Diguna Fango woreda and Bilate River.  The administrative center of this woreda is Bada Town.

Notes 

Wolayita
Districts of the Southern Nations, Nationalities, and Peoples' Region